Bipinpal Das (1923-2005)was an Indian politician belonging to the Indian National Congress. He was elected to the Lok Sabha, lower house of the Parliament of India from the Tezpur Assam and he was earlier a member of the  Rajya Sabha the Upper house of the Parliament of India. He was the Union Deputy Minister of External Affairs.

References

Indian National Congress politicians
India MPs 1984–1989
1923 births
Lok Sabha members from Assam
Rajya Sabha members from Assam
2005 deaths
Indian National Congress politicians from Assam